Pittsfield is a town in Brown County in the U.S. state of Wisconsin. The population was 2,608 at the 2010 census. The unincorporated communities of Anston, Kunesh, and Mill Center are located in the town. The unincorporated community of Pittsfield is also located partially in the town.

Geography
Pittsfield is located in northwestern Brown County, bordered by Oconto County to the north, Shawano County to the west, and Outagamie County partially on the south. The village of Pulaski borders the northwest corner of the town, the village of Suamico lies along the town's eastern border, and the village of Howard is to the south in Brown County.

Demographics
As of the census of 2000, there were 2,433 people, 818 households, and 697 families residing in the town. The population density was 75.7 people per square mile (29.2/km2).  There were 838 housing units at an average density of 26.1 per square mile (10.1/km2). The racial makeup of the town was 98.31% White, 0.21% African American, 0.62% Native American, 0.53% Asian, 0.04% from other races, and 0.29% from two or more races. Hispanic or Latino of any race were 0.41% of the population.

There were 818 households, out of which 43.2% had children under the age of 18 living with them, 75.9% were married couples living together, 4.9% had a female householder with no husband present, and 14.7% were non-families. 10.6% of all households were made up of individuals, and 3.9% had someone living alone who was 65 years of age or older. The average household size was 2.95 and the average family size was 3.18.

In the town, the population was spread out, with 29.1% under the age of 18, 5.5% from 18 to 24, 29.8% from 25 to 44, 27.2% from 45 to 64, and 8.4% who were 65 years of age or older. The median age was 38 years. For every 100 females, there were 105.8 males. For every 100 females age 18 and over, there were 102.8 males.

The median income for a household in the town was $61,250, and the median income for a family was $64,113. Males had a median income of $41,406 versus $26,821 for females. The per capita income for the town was $22,000. About 1.2% of families and 2.3% of the population were below the poverty line, including 0.8% of those under age 18 and 4.1% of those age 65 or over.

References

External links
Town of Pittsfield

Towns in Brown County, Wisconsin
Green Bay metropolitan area
Towns in Wisconsin